Gutta-percha is a tree of the genus Palaquium in the family Sapotaceae. The name also refers to the rigid, naturally biologically inert, resilient, electrically nonconductive,  thermoplastic latex derived from the tree, particularly from Palaquium gutta; it is a polymer of isoprene which forms a rubber-like elastomer.

The word "gutta-percha" comes from the plant's name in Malay: getah translates as "latex". Percha or perca is an older name for Sumatra.

Description

The flowers are produced in small clusters along the stems, each flower with a white corolla with four to seven (mostly six) acute lobes. The fruit is an ovoid  berry, containing one to four seeds; in many species, the fruit is edible.

In Australia, gutta-percha is a common name specifically used for the euphorbiaceous tree Excoecaria parvifolia, which yields an aromatic, heavy, dark-brown timber.

Chemistry

Chemically, gutta-percha is a polyterpene, a polymer of isoprene, or polyisoprene, specifically (trans-1,4-polyisoprene). The cis structure of polyisoprene is the common latex elastomer. While latex rubbers are amorphous in molecular structure, gutta-percha (the trans structure) crystallizes, leading to a more rigid material.  It exists in alpha and beta forms, with the alpha form being brittle at room temperature.

Uses

Historic 

Long before Gutta-percha was introduced into the Western world, it was used in a less processed form by the natives of the Malaysian archipelago for making knife handles, walking sticks, and other purposes. The first European to discover this material was John Tradescant, who collected it in the far east in 1656. He named this material "Mazer wood". William Montgomerie, a medical officer in imperial service, introduced gutta-percha into practical use in the West. He was the first to appreciate the potential of this material in medicine, and he was awarded the gold medal by the Royal Society of Arts, London in 1843.

Scientifically classified in 1843, it was found to be a useful natural thermoplastic. In 1851,  of gutta-percha was imported into Britain. During the second half of the 19th century, gutta-percha was used for many domestic and industrial purposes, and it became a household word. Gutta-percha was particularly important for the manufacture of underwater telegraph cables. Indeed, it made them possible. It does not degrade in seawater and is a good electrical insulator. These properties, along with its mouldability and flexibility made it ideal for the purpose. There was no other material to match it in the 19th century. The use in electrical cables generated a huge demand which led to unsustainable harvesting and collapse of supply.

Electrical
Gutta-percha latex is biologically inert, resilient, and is a good electrical insulator with a high dielectric strength.

Michael Faraday discovered its value as an insulator soon after the introduction of the material to Britain in 1843. Allowing this fluid to evaporate and coagulate in the sun produced a latex which could be made flexible again with hot water, but which did not become brittle, unlike rubber prior to the discovery of vulcanization.

By 1845, telegraph wires insulated with gutta-percha were being manufactured in the UK. It served as the insulating material for early undersea telegraph cables, including the first transatlantic telegraph cable. The material was a major constituent of Chatterton's compound used as an insulating sealant for telegraph and other electrical cables.

The dielectric constant of dried gutta-percha ranges from 2.56 to 3.01.  Resistivity of dried gutta-percha ranges from 25 x 1014 to 370 x 1014 ohm-cm. 

Since about 1940, polyethylene has supplanted gutta-percha as an electrical insulator.

Other

In the mid-19th century, gutta-percha was used to make furniture, notably by the Gutta Percha Company, established in 1847. Several of these ornate, revival-style pieces were shown at the 1851 Great Exhibition in Hyde Park, London. The company also made a range of utensils.

The "guttie" golf ball (which had a solid gutta-percha core) revolutionized the game. Gutta-percha was used to make "mourning" jewelry, because it was dark in color and could be easily molded into beads or other shapes. Pistol hand grips and rifle shoulder pads were also made from gutta-percha, since it was hard and durable, though it fell into disuse when synthetic plastics such as Bakelite became available.

Gutta-percha was used in canes and walking sticks. In 1856, United States Representative Preston Brooks used a cane made of gutta-percha as a weapon in his attack on Senator Charles Sumner.

The wood of many species is also valuable.

Today

Dentistry

The same bioinertness that made it suitable for marine cables also means it does not readily react within the human body. It is used in a variety of surgical devices and during root canal therapy. It is the predominant material used to obturate, or fill, the empty space inside the root of a tooth after it has undergone endodontic therapy. Its physical and chemical properties, including  its inertness and biocompatibility, melting point, ductility, and malleability, make it important in endodontics, e.g., as gutta-percha points. Zinc oxide is added to reduce brittleness and improve plasticity. Barium sulfate is added to provide radiopacity so that its presence and location can be verified in dental X-ray images.

Substitutes
Gutta-percha remained an industrial staple well into the 20th century, when it was gradually replaced with superior synthetic materials such as Bakelite, though a similar and cheaper natural material called balatá was often used in gutta-percha's place. The two materials are almost identical, and balatá is often called gutta-balatá.

Flotsam
Blocks of flotsam, about the size of a chopping board, bearing the name "Tjipetir" (a plantation in the Dutch East Indies, now Indonesia, operating in the late 19th and early 20th centuries), were washed up on the beaches of northern Europe for some time through 2013 and 2014.

See also
Natural rubber
Gutta-percha Boy, a 1957 Soviet drama film

References

External links
Germplasm Resources Information Network: Palaquium
Gutta-percha on the Transatlantic cable site
The Gutta Percha Company on the History of the Atlantic Cable site

Dentistry
Palaquium
Rubber
Endodontics